Denys Leontiyovych Maliuska (born 19 November 1981) is a Ukrainian lawyer, businessman and politician. Since 29 August 2019 he is Minister of Justice of Ukraine.

Biography 
Maliuska studied law at the Taras Shevchenko National University of Kyiv (2004). He also graduated from the University of London (2016). Master of Laws.

From 2000 to 2010, Maliuska worked as a lawyer at the law firm Business Law. From 2010 to 2019, he served as a private sector consultant for the World Bank Group.

Deputy Chairman of the Board of BRDO/World Bank Group.

He was on a party list of the Servant of the People political party during the 2019 parliamentary elections, yet himself is not a registered member of the party (non-partisan, according to the Central Election Commission). Maliuska was elected to the Verkhovna Rada in 2019. He surrendered his deputy mandate upon his ministerial appointment on 29 August 2019.

On 29 August 2019, Maliuska was appointed as the Minister of Justice of Ukraine in the Honcharuk Government. In the 4 March 2020 appointed Shmyhal Government he kept this post.

Iryna Mudra is one of his deputies.

See also 
 Honcharuk Government
 List of members of the parliament of Ukraine, 2019–24

References

External links 
 

1981 births
Living people
People from Dunaivtsi
University of Kyiv, Law faculty alumni
Alumni of the University of London
21st-century Ukrainian lawyers
21st-century Ukrainian businesspeople
Ninth convocation members of the Verkhovna Rada
Justice ministers of Ukraine
Servant of the People (political party) politicians
21st-century Ukrainian politicians